Jean-Victor Castor (born 21 April 1962) is a French politician who was elected to represent French Guiana's 1st constituency in the 2022 legislative election. He is a member of the Decolonization and Social Emancipation Movement (MDES), a pro-independence party. He succeeded Lénaïck Adam, a member of La République En Marche!

Early life and background 
Castor was born in Sinnamary, French Guiana on 21 April 1962. Born to two teachers, Castor was the seventh born child of a family of eight children. Castor studied in Cayenne during his youth, and at age 16 became involved in student activism. He later studied in Metropolitan France before returning to Guiana, where he would campaign for the Union of Guyanese Students (UEG).

Career

Activism and journalism 
In 1985, he was one of the founders of Rot Kozé, which was created shortly after the founding of the Decolonization and Social Emancipation Movement (MDES). Castor later organized with the Union of Guyanese Workers and the Unified Trade Union Movement. In 2012, he became secretary-general of the MDES.

National Assembly of France 
In the 2022 legislative election, Castor ran to represent French Guiana's 1st constituency in the National Assembly. In the first round of the election, he came in second place with 17.30% of the vote, with Yvane Goua of La France Insoumise coming in first with 20.77% of the vote. As a candidate, he was supported by the New Anticapitalist Party (NPA).

References 

Living people
1962 births
People from Sinnamary
French political candidates
Members of the National Assembly (France)
Deputies of the 16th National Assembly of the French Fifth Republic
Members of Parliament for French Guiana
21st-century French politicians
French trade unionists